Odesskoye is a rural locality (a selo) and the administrative center of Odessky District, Omsk Oblast, Russia. Population:

Climate

References

Notes

Sources

Rural localities in Omsk Oblast